Robert Forest may refer to:

 Robert Forest (cyclist) (born 1961), former French cyclist
 Robert Forest (architect), American architect with Adrian Smith + Gordon Gill Architecture

See also
 Robert Forrest (disambiguation)